No Way Out is a 1950 American film noir directed by Joseph L. Mankiewicz, and starring Richard Widmark, Linda Darnell, Sidney Poitier, and Stephen McNally, who portrays a doctor tending to slum residents whose ethics are tested when confronted with racism, personified by Widmark as hateful robber Ray Biddle.

No Way Out was controversial in its "graphic representation of racial violence" in what director Mankiewicz termed "the absolute blood and guts of Negro hating." The film marked the feature-acting debuts of Poitier and Mildred Joanne Smith. Mankiewicz and Lesser Samuels were also nominated for Best Story and Screenplay at the 23rd Academy Awards, losing to Charles Brackett, Billy Wilder, and D. M. Marshman Jr. for Sunset Boulevard.

Plot

Dr. Luther Brooks is the first African-American doctor at the urban county hospital where he trained. Despite assurances from his mentor, chief resident Dr. Dan Wharton, Brooks sometimes lacks confidence in his own skills. Brooks is working at the hospital's prison ward when Johnny and Ray Biddle, brothers who were both shot in the leg while attempting a robbery, are brought in for treatment. Johnny's symptoms, such as disorientation and dilated pupils, worry Luther. The bigoted Ray bombards Luther with racist slurs as he tries to treat them.

Concerned that Johnny has a brain tumor, Luther administers a spinal tap, but Johnny dies during the procedure. Ray, who believes that Johnny was only suffering from a gunshot to the leg, accuses Luther of killing him, and promises revenge. Luther consults with Wharton, who believes Luther followed the right course of treatment, but concedes the diagnosis may have been incorrect.

To determine whether his treatment was correct, Luther requests an autopsy of Johnny, but Ray refuses to consent; he does not want his brother's body "cut up". The head of the hospital also denies the autopsy request, because he fears that a scandal involving their only black doctor could endanger funding. 
 
Luther and Wharton visit Johnny's widow, Edie Johnson, seeking her help in getting an autopsy. Edie grew up with the Biddles in the city's poor, white Beaver Canal district, where racism is prevalent; she refuses to help them, but the conflicted Edie later visits Ray in the prison ward to ask why he will not approve the autopsy. Ray tells her that Johnny would still be alive if he would have had a white doctor, and that Wharton and Luther only want the autopsy so they can cover up the truth about Johnny's death. Ray convinces Edie that the doctors are attempting to play her for a "chump", and that she should tell Beaver Canal club owner Rocky Miller about the circumstances surrounding Johnny's death. Accompanied by Ray's deaf-mute other brother George, Edie does this, and Rocky and his pals plan to attack the black section of town.

Luther, speaking with a black elevator operator, learns that the black community has heard about the pending attack and is planning to strike first. When Luther tries to dissuade him, the operator reminds him of past assaults on the black community, and asks, "Ain't it asking a lot for us to be better than them when we get killed just trying to prove we're as good?" The race riot occurs, and Luther tends to its victims until a white woman orders him to take his "black hands" off her son and spits in his face. Stunned, Luther walks out.

Despondent at what her actions have caused, Edie visits Wharton's home, where after initial racist misgivings, she befriends his black maid, Gladys. Wharton, Gladys, and Edie learn that Luther has turned himself in for the murder of Johnny Biddle. Wharton realizes that Luther has done this to force the coroner to conduct an autopsy on Biddle.

The autopsy confirms that Johnny died of a brain tumor and that Luther's course of treatment was correct. Ray only grows angrier at this, convinced of a conspiracy to bury the truth. After overhearing Wharton say that he is leaving town for vacation, Ray and George overpower the police guard and escape, with Ray reinjuring his wounded leg. Ray and George force Edie to call Luther and lure him to Wharton's empty house. Drunk and in great pain, Ray raves that he is going to kill Luther and leaves. Edie manages to escape from George and calls the police to help Luther.

At Wharton's house, Ray holds a gun on Luther as he beats him and shouts slurs. Edie arrives and sees that Ray's physical pain and obsessive hatred have pushed him beyond reason. Edie turns out the lights as Ray shoots. Luther is wounded in the shoulder, but grabs Ray's gun after he collapses in pain. Luther asserts that he cannot let Ray die simply because of his racism, and convinces Edie to help him save Ray's life. As sirens wail in the distance, Luther tells the hysterical Ray, "Don't cry, white boy, you're gonna live."

Cast

Cast notes
Director Joseph Mankiewicz personally selected Sidney Poitier from a small group of finalists for the part of the young medical doctor Luther Brooks. Characterized by "emotional intensity and grace", the part launched Poitier's film career.

The film also marks the first time that Ossie Davis (film debut) and Ruby Dee appeared together on screen, both uncredited.

Reception 
In a contemporary review for The New York Times, critic Thomas M. Pryor wrote:Sometimes the sting of a club will make more of an impression than appeals to the intellect. No Way Out makes no attempt to mask the ugliness and the ignorance of a manifestation of bigotry, which has long festered in our society and is peculiarly at odds with the fundamentals of our political and religious philosophies. No Way Out poses the problem and says in effect, 'What are you going to do about it?' Some people may, like this reviewer, wish that the men who made this picture had tackled the subject with less melodramatic flair. ... Although its aim is not always as good as its intentions, No Way Out is a harsh, outspoken picture with implications that will keep you thinking about it long after leaving the theatre. That makes No Way Out an important picture.

See also

List of films featuring the deaf and hard of hearing

References

Further reading
 Quigley, Mark. 2004. No Way Out, 1950. UCLA Film and Television Archive: 12th Festival of Preservation, July 22-August 21, 2004. Festival guest handbook.
 Selby, Spencer. Dark City: The Film Noir. Jefferson, North Carolina: McFarland Publishing, 1984. .

External links
 
 
 
 
 

1950 films
1950 drama films
20th Century Fox films
African-American drama films
American black-and-white films
American drama films
1950s English-language films
Film noir
Films about race and ethnicity
Films about racism
Films about social class
Films directed by Joseph L. Mankiewicz
Films produced by Darryl F. Zanuck
Films scored by Alfred Newman
Films with screenplays by Joseph L. Mankiewicz
Films with screenplays by Lesser Samuels
Films set in hospitals
1950s American films